The 1981 Seiko World Super Tennis also known as the Tokyo Indoor was a men's tennis tournament played on indoor carpet courts at the Yoyogi National Stadium in Tokyo, Japan that was part of the Super Series of the 1981 Volvo Grand Prix circuit. The tournament was held from 26 October through 30 October 1981. Matches were the best of three sets. Unseeded Vincent Van Patten won the singles titles. On his way to the final he defeated seeded players José Luis Clerc (3), Vitas Gerulaitis (5), and John McEnroe (1).

Finals

Singles

 Vincent Van Patten defeated  Mark Edmondson 6–2, 3–6, 6–3
 It was Van Patten's only singles title of his career.

Doubles

 Victor Amaya /  Hank Pfister defeated  Heinz Günthardt /  Balázs Taróczy 6–4, 6–2

References

External links
 ITF tournament edition details

Tokyo Indoor
Tokyo Indoor
Tokyo Indoor